Lavender is a 2015 Malayalam-language romantic action film written by Anoop Menon and directed by Altas T. Ali, starring Rahman, Nishan, Anoop Menon, Govind Padmasoorya, Aju Varghese and Thalaivasal Vijay. Iranian theater artiste Elham Mirza debut as the heroine in the film. The film is shot mostly in Thailand. The film was released on 26 June 2015. The movie is loosely based on the Korean movie Daisy.

Cast
 Rahman as Ayaan/Ajay
 Elham Mirza as Isha
 Nishan as Siddarth
 Anoop Menon as Raghavan Moorthy
 Govind Padmasoorya as Kabir Abbas
 Aju Varghese as Raju
 Thalaivasal Vijay as Joseph Tharakan
 Delhi Ganesh as Isha's grandfather
 Kalpana as Janet
 Sudipto Balav as Sunny Tharakan

Plot

The film is actually a scenic depiction of the script written by Kabir Abbas(Govind Padmasoorya), as he narrates the story to his friend (Elham Mirza).

The story is happening at Bangkok, where Isha(Elham Mirza) is an artist who portrays sketches live. Ayaan (Rahman) is a resident who migrated in a fake name and has been residing there since then. Ayaan used to surprise Isha with a bunch of lavender flowers in between. Incidentally, Isha befriends Siddharth (Nishan), and mistakes him to be the person sending her Lavenders.

Isha had once been rescued, and taken to hospital after she had fallen off from a wooden bridge by someone whose identity is not yet unknown to her. Since then, she has been searching for that person, and it was the same person who is presenting her with the Lavender flower bouquets now. When Isha tells that it is Siddharth who sends her the flowers, Siddharth doesn't bother to deny it, leaving Isha a feeling that it is Siddharth, the person she was searching for. Siddharth reveals himself as a designer working in a graphic company. Matters go worse when Siddharth is being shot on a public place when he was with Isha. Isha also gets shot on her throat, and she was left there. Ayaan rushes to the spot and takes her to the hospital. She recovers, however her voice is lost.

Ayaan then befriends Isha. However, Isha reveals that she is already in love with Siddharth. They both then trace for Siddharth, however, they could not find him. A recovered Siddharth, revealed to us as an Interpol officer, is being advised by his senior Raghavan to forget his love and carry on with their duty. On her birthday, Ayaan visits her, and at the same time, Siddharth also visits her, reveals her the truth that he is an Interpol officer and has been cheating on her and take leave. He also notices Ayaan present there.

Based on orders from his boss Joseph Tharakan, Ayaan sets out to kill Siddharth. Despite having an opportunity of shooting Siddharth, Ayaan reveals to him that Isha still loves him and he will move out from their life. However, then Siddharth is found shot to death. Isha is upset about hearing Siddharth's death. She is being consoled by Ayaan. Joseph assigns Ayaan to kill Raghavan. Ayaan was not willing to take it up. But as Joseph promises that it will be his last execution, and after that, Ayaan will be free to live his own life, Ayaan takes up. Isha finds the photo of Siddharth and a gun in a brief case at Ayaans home and then concludes that Ayaan is the murderer of Siddharth, and she blames him for doing the same. Grief-stricken, Ayaan surrenders to the Interpol. Eventually, Isha discovers the truth and rushes to have a glance of Ayaan. She dies while protecting Ayaan from a bullet. Ayaan clears of Joseph and his colleagues and falls dead.

The story narration ends there, and Kabir bids farewell to his friend after the narration. Later, he is surprised to see a bunch of lavender flowers on his doorstep.

Promotion 
Tamil actor Suriya promoted the film in the audio launch function held in Lulu Mall, Kochi on 24 May 2015.

Soundtrack 
The soundtrack for the film was composed by Deepak Dev, and the lyrics were penned by Rafeeq Ahamed.

References

External links 
 
 

2015 films
2010s Malayalam-language films
2015 action drama films
2015 romantic drama films
Films shot in Thailand
Indian remakes of South Korean films
Indian action drama films
Indian romantic action films
Indian romantic drama films
2010s romantic action films